The Fountain of Bakhchisaray is a 1909 Russian short drama film directed by Yakov Protazanov. It is a lost film.

Plot 
The Crimean Khan Giray brings a girl Maria to the harem, which causes jealousy of Zarema, who loves Khan more than anything else. Zarema speaks about this to Maria, who is eager for freedom and understands that this is possible only after death. Khan, when he learns of Maria's death, gives the order to execute Zarema and build a fountain of tears.

Cast 
 Vladimir Shaternikov as khan
 Maria Korolyova as Zarema
 E. Uvarova

References

External links 
 
 «The Fountain of Bakhchisaray» on kinopoisk.ru
 «The Fountain of Bakhchisaray» on kino-teatr.ru

1909 films
1900s Russian-language films
Lost Russian films
1909 short films
Russian silent short films
Russian black-and-white films
Films of the Russian Empire
Russian drama films
1909 drama films
1909 lost films
Lost drama films
Silent drama films